Golden Fleece Mining and Milling Company may refer to:

 Golden Fleece Mining and Milling Company (Iowa), incorporated in 1893
 Golden Fleece Mining and Milling Company (New York), incorporated in 1882